The 2023 Asia Pacific Masters Games, the second edition of the Asia Pacific Masters Games, also known as Jeonbuk 2023, will be held in the South Korean province of North Jeolla from 12 to 20 May 2023. Organised by the International Masters Games Association (IMGA), it is the second Masters Games for the Asia-Pacific region.

Host city 
North Jeolla was selected as the host of the inaugural edition of the Asia Pacific Masters Games during a bidding process in Lausanne, Switzerland in 2019.

Mascots 

Achi & Taechi are the official mascots of the 2023 Asia Pacific Masters Games. Achi & Taechi are described as white and black magpies and were chosen as the oriental magpie is the official bird of the North Jeolla Province.

Sports 
The second edition of the Asia Pacific Masters Games in 2023 will include 26 sports. In 2023, Roller sports, sailing, triathlon, baseball, park golf, gateball, and judo will be added, while lion dance, netball, pencak silat will be removed.

Individual Sports:

 Archery
 Athletics
 Badminton
 Cycling
 Golf
 Judo
 Park golf (demo)
 Roller sports
 Sailing
 Shooting
 Squash
 Swimming
 Table tennis
 Taekwondo
 Tennis
 Ten-pin bowling
 Triathlon
 Weightlifting
 Wushu

Team Sports:

 Baseball
 Basketball
 Football
 Gateball (demo)
 Hockey
 Softball
 Volleyball

Participating nations

Below are the countries of origin of the participating athletes. Note that there are no national delegations in Masters Games, as the athletes compete on their own.

Asia Pacific
















  
 







See also 

 Asia Pacific Masters Games
 European Masters Games
 Pan-American Masters Games

References

External links 
 2023 Asia Pacific Masters Games

Masters Games
Asia Pacific Masters Games
2023 in South Korean sport
Multi-sport events in South Korea
Asia Pacific Masters Games
Asia Pacific Masters Games